The Daytime Emmy Award for Outstanding Younger Actor in a Drama Series was an award presented annually by the National Academy of Television Arts and Sciences (NATAS) and Academy of Television Arts & Sciences (ATAS). It was given annually from 1985 to 2019 to honor a young actor below the age of 25, who had delivered an outstanding performance in a role while working within the daytime drama industry.

At the 12th Daytime Emmy Awards held in 1985, Brian Bloom was the first winner of this award for his portrayal of Dusty Donovan on As the World Turns. The awards ceremony had not been aired on television for the prior two years, having been criticized for voting integrity. The award category was originally called Outstanding Young Man or Outstanding Juvenile Male in a Drama Series, and began using its current title in 1991. Years before this category was introduced, networks declined to broadcast the show during a time of voting integrity rumors and waning interest. Confusion rose around the criteria of the new category due to the varying ages of the nominees. Within the first set of nominees, Bloom became the youngest actor nominated for a Daytime Emmy Award at the time at age 15, while the other actors nominated in the category were over 25. The criteria were later altered, requiring that the actor be aged 25 or below.

The award was presented to 25 actors. Guiding Light had the most recipients of this award, with a total of seven wins. In 1992, Kristoff St. John became the first African-American to have garnered the award, winning for his role as Neil Winters on The Young and the Restless. Chandler Massey and Jonathan Jackson were the actors with the most awards, with a total of three each. In 2000, Jackson also became the actor to have received the most nominations, surpassing Bryan Buffington's previous record of five. Scott Clifton, Bryton James, David Lago and Joshua Morrow have also received five nominations each.

At the 2019 ceremony, Kyler Pettis became the last awarded actor in this category for his portrayal of Theo Carver, on Days of Our Lives. In October 2019, the NATAS decided to replace both younger actor and  actress categories with a single gender-neutral one: Outstanding Younger Performer in a Drama Series.

Winners and nominees
Listed below are the winners of the award for each year, as well as the other nominees.

1980s

1990s

2000s

2010s

Multiple wins and nominations

The following individuals received two or more wins in this category:

The following individuals received two or more nominations in this category:

Series with most awards

References

External links
 

Younger Actor in a Drama Series
Awards established in 1985
Awards for young actors
Awards disestablished in 2019
2019 disestablishments in the United States
1985 establishments in the United States